Falling Home may refer to:

 Falling Home (Jude Cole album), 2000
 Falling Home (Pain of Salvation album), 2014